Procletus is a genus of beetles in the family Carabidae, containing the following species:

 Procletus aethiopicus Kirschenhofer, 2003 
 Procletus biarticulatus (Burgeon, 1935) 
 Procletus comoensis Kirschenhofer, 2008 
 Procletus cryptomydis Basilewsky, 1950 
 Procletus gabunensis Kirschenhofer, 2008 
 Procletus minor Basilewsky, 1950 
 Procletus pretorianus (Peringuey, 1926) 
 Procletus singularis Peringuey, 1896 
 Procletus subniger Kirschenhofer, 2008 
 Procletus tanzaniensis Kirschenhofer, 2003 
 Procletus werneri Kirschenhofer, 2008

References

Licininae